Sedalia is an unincorporated community and census-designated place (CDP) in Graves County, Kentucky, United States. As of the 2010 census the population was 295. Sedalia is considered one of the nicest small “towns” in Graves County. 

Demographics

References

Census-designated places in Graves County, Kentucky
Census-designated places in Kentucky